80th Regiment or 80th Infantry Regiment may refer to:

 80th Regiment of Foot (Royal Edinburgh Volunteers), a unit of the British Army, 1778–1783
 80th Regiment of Foot (Staffordshire Volunteers), a unit of the British Army
 80th Airmobile Regiment (Ukraine), a unit of the Ukrainian Army
 80th Infantry Regiment (Imperial Japanese Army), a unit of the Japanese Army
 80th Training Regiment (United States) a unit of the United States Army Reserve

 American Civil War regiments 
 80th Illinois Volunteer Infantry Regiment, a unit of the Union (North) Army 
 80th Indiana Infantry Regiment, a unit of the Union (North) Army 
 80th New York Volunteer Infantry Regiment, a unit of the Union (North) Army 
 80th Ohio Infantry, a unit of the Union (North) Army 
 80th United States Colored Infantry Regiment, a unit of the Union Army in Louisiana

See also
 80th Division (disambiguation)
 80 Squadron (disambiguation)